Dene Maxwell Olding  (born 11 October 1956) is an Australian violinist.  He has had a distinguished career as a soloist in Australia, New Zealand and the United States, performing over forty concertos in recent years, including many world premieres.  He is the Concertmaster Emeritus of the Sydney Symphony Orchestra, first violinist in the Goldner String Quartet, and a member of the Australia Ensemble.

Biography
Dene Olding is the son of the husband and wife piano duo Max Olding and Pamela Page. He was initially educated at the Anglican Church Grammar School in Brisbane, but left at age 15—two years before he was due to graduate—to attend the Juilliard School in New York as a scholarship student of Ivan Galamian and Margaret Pardee. He graduated from Juilliard in 1978. He attended master classes with Nathan Milstein and had further lessons with Herman Krebbers and György Pauk.

He joined the Australia Ensemble in 1982, and was also at that time leader of the Australian Chamber Orchestra. In 1985, he was awarded a Churchill Fellowship to further his musical studies.  During that year, he won a Bronze medal at the Queen Elisabeth Music Competition in Belgium.

He was concertmaster of the Sydney Symphony Orchestra from 1987 to 1994, and again from 2002 to 2016.  On his retirement he was appointed Concertmaster Emeritus of the orchestra. He is also a frequent guest concertmaster of the Melbourne Symphony Orchestra.

Dene Olding is regularly heard as soloist with all the major Australian orchestras and has worked with conductors such as Edo de Waart, Stanisław Skrowaczewski, Stuart Challender, Sir Charles Mackerras, Jorge Mester, Günther Herbig, Werner Andreas Albert and David Porcelijn.

He gave the Australian premieres of Witold Lutosławski's Chain 2 with the composer conducting, and the violin concertos by Elliott Carter and Philip Glass.

He has made many recordings, including one of sonatas by Brahms, Beethoven and Mozart, with his father Max Olding. His recording of Ross Edwards' Maninyas won the 1994 ARIA Award for Best Classical Recording, and the Cannes award.  He made the first CD recording of concertos by Frank Martin, Darius Milhaud and Samuel Barber.  He has recorded the violin concerti of Paul Hindemith with the Queensland Symphony Orchestra under Werner Andreas Albert.

He was the Artistic Advisor and Chair of the Jury of the 2018 ABC Young Performers Award, held at the Sydney Opera House with the Sydney Symphony Orchestra.

He plays a Joseph Guarnerius violin made in 1720.  In the Edwards, Martin, Milhaud and Barber recordings, he used the A. E. Smith violin he inherited from a previous Sydney Symphony concertmaster, Ernest Llewellyn.

He has conducted the Sydney Symphony and Auckland Philharmonia Orchestra.

Personal life
Olding is married to Irina Morozova, a violist with the Goldner String Quartet and the Australia Ensemble. Together they have a son, Nicolai.

Olding is a practitioner of Aikido.

Awards and nominations

ARIA Music Awards
The ARIA Music Awards is an annual awards ceremony that recognises excellence, innovation, and achievement across all genres of Australian music. They commenced in 1987. 

! 
|-
|rowspan="2" | 1994
| Ross Edwards Orchestral Works (with Sydney Symphony Orchestra, Stuart Challender & David Porcelijn)
|rowspan="2" | Best Classical Album
| 
|rowspan="2" | 
|-
| Violin Concertos (with Melbourne Symphony Orchestra & Hiroyuki Iwaki)
| 
|-

References

Sources
 Australia Ensemble
 Sydney Symphony concertmasters 

ARIA Award winners
Australian classical violinists
Male classical violinists
Living people
1956 births
Concertmasters
People educated at Anglican Church Grammar School
Members of the Order of Australia
21st-century classical violinists
21st-century Australian male musicians
21st-century Australian musicians